You may also be looking for the song The Red Poppies on Monte Cassino.

The Red Poppies on Monte Cassino - poems and songs 1939–1945 is the title of a collection of period works by Feliks Konarski (pseudonym: Ref-Ren). The book's title, "Czerwone Maki", is also the name of one of the most famous Polish songs to emerge from World War II.

Content 
Konarski began to write poems and songs after a two-year break. This book contains the works written after Konarski joined the Polish Second Corps in December 1941. Konarski wrote a regular basis, but rarely published his works.

The Polish Second Corps, led by General Władysław Anders, stormed the strategic Abbey on Monte Cassino. On the eve of this decisive battle, Konarski wrote the book's title work, "The Red Poppies on Monte Cassino". It has combative, and emotional words. The song became an unofficial national anthem during the communist occupation of Poland, and it was banned in that country during the 1950s.

Konarski's works in this book are arranged as a chronicle of the tragic fate and the combat roles taken by the Polish Second Corps.

The book's cover shows the image of the Black Madonna of Częstochowa, a holy icon of the Virgin Mary, that is both Poland's holiest relic and one of the country's national symbols, looking over the remaining ruins of the famous Abbey of Monte Cassino after the battle.

Notes

Polish books
2004 books